The John and Marcia Price College of Engineering at the University of Utah is an academic college of the University of Utah in Salt Lake City, Utah. The college offers undergraduate and graduate degrees in engineering and computer science.

History

The College of Engineering at the University of Utah originated from the State School of Mines, established in the 1890s. Dedicated to enhancing Utah's mining industry, it was among the first engineering programs west of the Mississippi River.

The first modern four-year engineering degree at the school was introduced in 1895. Joseph F. Merrill was the first principal and the Merrill Engineering Building was named in his honor. Richard Lyman was recruited from Brigham Young Academy to teach the technical engineering curriculum. Lyman organized the first Department of Engineering in 1896.

During the past 118 years, the College has awarded nearly 24,000 engineering degrees. Many alumni have achieved international recognition in industry, manufacturing, research, education, law, medicine and many other professions.

Some of the companies founded by graduates and faculty of the College of Engineering include: TRW, Evans and Sutherland, Silicon Graphics, Netscape, WordPerfect, Sarcos, Opto 22, Novell, Atari, Adobe, and Pixar, to name a few. Many other graduates hold executive leadership positions in companies and educational institutions worldwide; several also actively serve their communities in civic and governmental leadership roles.

Today, approximately 3,400 undergraduate and nearly 1,100 graduate students are enrolled in the College.  The College has 156 tenure and tenure-track faculty members and $81.5 million in engineering research expenditures, which places it 30th among 206 engineering colleges for research productivity.

Accreditation
The University of Utah is accredited by the Northwest Commission on Colleges and Universities.

The College of Engineering is a member of the American Society for Engineering Education.

The Accreditation Board for Engineering and Technology has accredited the following undergraduate programs in the College of Engineering: bioengineering, chemical engineering, civil engineering, computer engineering, electrical engineering, materials science and engineering, and mechanical engineering.

Rankings
The U.S. News & World Report ranks the College of Engineering at the University of Utah: 

 #34 Biomedical Engineering (out of 107 graduate programs)
 #48 Electrical/Electronic/Communications Engineering (out of 177 graduate programs)
 #49 Computer Engineering (among 143 graduate programs) 
 #51 Materials Engineering (among 95 graduate programs)
 #53 Best Engineering Schools (among 193 graduate programs) 
 #53 Civil Engineering (among 145 graduate programs) 
 #57 Chemical Engineering (among 126 graduate programs) 
 #61 Mechanical Engineering (among 170 graduate programs) 
 #74 Environmental/Environmental Health Engineering (among 100 graduate programs)

The American Society of Engineering Education (ASEE) ranks the College of Engineering at the University of Utah: 

 #26 Computer science [inside engineering] degrees (among 171 schools)
 #34 Engineering doctoral degrees awarded (among 196 schools)
 #35 Tenured/tenure-track faculty (among 357 schools)
 #35 Highest ratio of research expenditures to doctoral degree recipients (among 126 schools) 
 #39 Mechanical engineering degrees (among 288 schools) 
 #39 Undergraduate enrollment (among 348 schools)
 #47 Graduate school enrolment (among 271 schools)

Departments
The College of Engineering is made up of seven departments: bioengineering, chemical engineering, civil and environmental engineering, electrical and computer engineering, materials science and engineering, mechanical engineering, and the School of Computing.

The College is also home to four specialty engineering programs including computer engineering, entertainment arts and engineering, nuclear engineering and petroleum engineering, as well as 28 multidisciplinary research institutes and centers.

In 2014, the College began offering data center engineering and big data certificate programs. The data center engineering certificate program prepares undergraduates for work in data center operations and management by combining mechanical engineering, electrical engineering and computer science coursework. The big data certificate program draws on computer science coursework to provide graduate students and professional computer scientists the skills to process, analyze and manage large, complex data.

Biomedical Engineering

The Biomedical Engineering Department at the University of Utah offers undergraduate degrees in Biomedical Engineering and graduate degrees in Biomedical Engineering.  The Department has major research funding that supports initiatives in:
 BioDesign
 Biomedical Imaging
 Biomechanics
 Cardiovascular Engineering
 Molecular, Cell, and Tissue Therapeutics
 Neural Engineering

Many Biomedical Engineering faculty members are adjunct faculty at University of Utah School of Medicine, leading to several successful interdisciplinary research projects between the School of Medicine and the College of Engineering.

Chemical Engineering

The Department of Chemical Engineering at the University of Utah offers undergraduate and graduate degrees in Chemical Engineering. This Department was recently ranked 5th nationally in federal research and development funding. It has major research funding that supports initiatives in:

 Biological and biomedical engineering
 Energy and fuels
 Environmental engineering
 Multi-scale simulation
 Nano materials and technology
 Reaction engineering
 Rheology
 Systems and control

The Department of Chemical Engineering administers the petroleum engineering Master of Science degree. Launched in 2013, the program produces well-qualified engineers who are knowledgeable about the responsible development of oil and gas resources.

Civil and Environmental Engineering

Civil and environmental engineering careers are ideal for students with both vision and analytic skills. As engineers develop in their careers, they will be challenged to imagine new ways to support the needs of business, industry, public agencies and nations.

At the University of Utah, the Department of Civil and Environmental Engineering (CvEEN) engineers are trained in professional communication, project management and their technical discipline with opportunities to seek advanced degrees in engineering, law, business or medicine. The department and local industry offer paid internships, scholarships and employment opportunities to help defray the cost of tuition and living expenses. CvEEN offers undergraduate and graduate degrees and has major research funding that supports initiatives in:

 Environmental Engineering
 Geotechnical and Construction Materials
 Structural Engineering
 Transportation
 Water Resources

The Civil and Environmental Engineering Department is also home to the growing Utah Nuclear Engineering Program (UNEP). Master's and doctoral degrees are offered to those holding a B.S. degree in engineering or a science-related field. Undergraduates can take selected courses as technical electives and in preparation for nuclear engineering graduate degree programs. http://www.nuclear.utah.edu

Electrical and Computer Engineering

The Electrical and Computer Engineering Department at the University of Utah offers undergraduate degrees in Electrical Engineering and Computer Engineering as well as graduate degrees in Electrical and Computer Engineering.  The Department has major research funding that supports initiatives in:

 Communications and signal processing
 Control systems
 Implantable medical devices
 Micro-Electro-Mechanical Systems (MEMS)
 Micro- and nano- devices and fabrication
 Microwaves and electromagnetics
 Optics and optoelectronics
 Power engineering
 Semiconductors
 VLSI system design

The Department of Electrical and Computer Engineering and the School of Computing jointly administer the computer engineering specialty program. The interdisciplinary program teaches students both hardware and software skills, as well as how to combine the skillsets to become successful computer engineers. http://www.ce.utah.edu

Materials Science and Engineering

The Department of Materials Science and Engineering at the University of Utah offers undergraduate and graduate degrees in materials science and engineering. The department has major research funding that supports initiatives in:

 Biomaterials
 Ceramics
 Composites
 Nanomaterials
 Semiconductors and electronic materials

Mechanical Engineering

The Department of Mechanical Engineering at the University of Utah offers undergraduate and graduate degrees in mechanical engineering. The department has major research funding that supports initiatives in:

 Bio-mechanical engineering
 Composites
 Control systems
 Design
  Energy systems
 Ergonomics and safety
 Fluid Mechanics
 Heat Transfer
 Manufacturing
 Micro- and nano- systems
 Thermodynamics
 Robotics
 Solid mechanics

School of Computing

The School of Computing at the University of Utah offers undergraduate and graduate degrees in computer science. The department has major research funding that supports initiatives in:

 Applied computation
 Artificial intelligence
 Computer graphics
 Computer systems
 Program analysis
 Data management, analysis, and visualization

The School of Computing is also home to the Entertainment Arts and Entertainment (EAE) Program, which is the result of interdisciplinary collaboration between the College of Engineering and the University of Utah College of Fine Arts. In 2014, the EAE Program was ranked second for its undergraduate program and fourth for its graduate program by the Princeton Review.

The University of Utah was one of the original four nodes of ARPANET, the world's first packet-switched network and embryo of the current worldwide Internet. In late 1969, the U's computer graphics department was linked into the node at Stanford Research Institute in Menlo Park, California to complete the initial four-node network.

The School of Computing has made important contributions to computer graphics and computer animation. These contributions include: Gouraud shading, the Phong reflection model, the Phong shading method, and the rendering equation.

The School of Computing is also affiliated with the Scientific Computing and Imaging Institute, which focuses on research in visualization, scientific computing, and medical image analysis. The institute currently has over 200 faculty and staff, most of which are from the School of Computing or Bioengineering departments.

Buildings

Warnock Engineering Building
The John and Marva Warnock Engineering building (referred to as the WEB) houses the offices of the College of Engineering. It also is the home of the Scientific Computing and Imaging Institute and numerous classrooms and study rooms. The building was named after John Warnock and his wife Marva Warnock, both of whom graduated from the University of Utah, after he generously donated almost $6 million for its construction in 2003. Some additional funding for the project came from the George S. and Dolores Dore Eccles Foundation. Construction on the building was completed in 2007.

The Scientific Computing and Imaging Institute is located in the WEB.

The primary goal for building the WEB was to provide study space for students.  The building is composed mainly of study rooms, classrooms, computer labs, and open spaces.  The WEB is also home to the College of Engineering Dean's Office.

Civil and Materials Engineering
The Civil and Materials Engineering Building (referred to as the CME) is home to the Materials Science and Engineering Department and the Civil and Environmental Engineering Department.

Kennecott Building
The Kennecott Building (referred to as Kenn) was built with generous support from Kennecott, operator of the Bingham Canyon Mine.

The Kennecott Building currently serves as classroom and lab space for the Mechanical Engineering Department.  However, starting in 2012, the Kennecott building will be undergoing major renovations and expansions in a four-phase plan to move the entire department over to the new Kennecott building. The first phase will be completed in late 2013.  After construction is complete, the Kennecott Building will house the entire Mechanical Engineering Department.

Floyd and Jeri Meldrum Civil Engineering Building
The Floyd and Jeri Meldrum Civil Engineering Building (referred to as the MCE) is a 14,500-square-foot addition to the former Energy and Minerals Research Building.  It brings together civil, environmental, and nuclear engineering faculty into adjacent space with a newly designed transportation operations center and environmental engineering labs. The construction of the building was supported by a generous $3.3 million gift from Floyd and Jeri Meldrum of Las Vegas.

Merrill Engineering Building
The Merrill Engineering building (referred to as the MEB) is named after Joseph F. Merrill who became the first principal of the College of Engineering. The first phase of construction on the Merrill Engineering Building was completed in 1960 and it served as the main building for the College of Engineering until the John and Marva Warnock Engineering building was completed. The building still houses most of the student and research labs used by the college of engineering.

The MEB also houses a TRIGA nuclear reactor 25 feet below ground level in a double-wall reactor tank filled with water that has been operating since 1975. The reactor was featured in a report by ABC in 2005 about the security concerns with university research reactors. ABC felt that the security was inadequate, but that has been disputed by many other sources.

The MEB is home to the School of Computing, the Electrical and Computer Engineering Department, and the Chemical Engineering Department.  It also has various classrooms, student labs, and student work areas.

James LeVoy Sorenson Molecular Biotechnology Building
The James LeVoy Sorenson Molecular Biotechnology Building (referred to as the SMBB), completed in 2012, is a 200,000-square-foot, $150 Million USTAR facility that supports research in medicine, pharmacy, engineering, microfluidics, computer science and life sciences.  The building is physically located between the College of Health Sciences on the upper campus and the College of Engineering on the lower campus to serve as a research complex that connects faculty in multidisciplinary research areas between the two colleges.

Notable alumni

Civil and Environmental Engineering

 Mark Fuller - CEO and co-founder of WET (Water Entertainment Technologies), an architectural water design firm that has internationally recognized performing water features in more than 20 countries.
 Theodore "Ted" Jacobsen — Led Jacobsen Construction for 30 years, building Utah icons such as the Jon M. Huntsman Center and the Grand America Hotel.
 Paul Hirst, P.E. — President and CEO of civil engineering firm Caldwell Richards Sorensen. Named distinguished alumnus in 2012.

Electrical Engineering
 Cleon Anderson - Former President and CEO of the Institute of Electrical and Electronics Engineers (IEEE).
 Nolan Bushnell - Founder of Atari and Chuck E. Cheese, he has been inducted into the Video Game Hall of Fame and the Consumer Electronics Association Hall of Fame. He was also named one of Newsweek's "50 Men That Changed America."
 David Evans - Computer scientist and graphics pioneer and co-founder of Evans & Sutherland
 Ralph Hartley - Co-founder of Information Theory (along with Shannon and Hamming), inventor of Hartley Transform and Hartley Oscillator, IEEE Medal of Honor recipient
 Akhlesh Lakhtakia - developed visualization technique for latent fingerprints in forensics
 Calvin Quate - One of the inventors of the atomic force microscope and recipient of the IEEE Medal of Honor
 Simon Ramo - The father of the intercontinental ballistic missile (ICBM) and partly responsible for the formation of two Fortune 500 companies
 John Warnock - Computer scientist best known as a co-founder of Adobe Systems Inc.
 Mary Jesse - wireless pioneer, executive and board member, entrepreneur, inventor and Professional Engineer (PE).
 Thomas Stockham - Father of digital recording, recipient of Grammy, Emmy and IEE fellowship. Led White House investigation team during Watergate scandal.

Mechanical Engineering
 Joseph Majdalani — Hugh and Loeda Francis Chair in Aerospace Engineering at Auburn University, Fellow of the American Society of Mechanical Engineers
 Gretchen W. McClain — President and CEO of Xylem Inc., former NASA Deputy Associate Administrator for Space Development
 Zane Beadles — Plays in the National Football League (NFL) as guard and tackle.

School of Computing

 Robert Adamson - Computer scientist. Developed Gener/OL, one of the first interpretive languages.
 Alan Ashton - Computer scientist, co-founder of WordPerfect and Thanksgiving Point
 Brian A. Barsky - Professor at the University of California, Berkeley working in computer graphics and geometric modeling as well as in optometry and vision science.
 Jim Blinn - Computer scientist and MacArthur Fellow, known for his work on Carl Sagan's Cosmos documentary and inventing the first method for representing surface textures in graphical images.
 Edwin Catmull - An Academy Award winning computer scientist and current president of Walt Disney Animation Studios and Pixar Animation Studios.
 Jim Clark - Computer scientist, prolific entrepreneur and founder of several technology companies, including Silicon Graphics, Inc., Netscape Communications Corporation, myCFO and Healtheon
 Frank Crow - Computer scientist, developed anti-aliasing methods for computer graphics
 Henri Gouraud, Computer scientist, inventor of Gouraud shading
 Jim Kajiya - Computer scientist, developed the frame buffer concept for storing and displaying single-raster images and the rendering equation.
 Alan Kay - Computer scientist, recipient of the Turing Award, credited with the concept of the Laptop computer.
 Martin Newell - Computer scientist and graphics pioneer best known as the creator of the Utah Teapot
Fred Parke - creator of the first CG physically modeled human face
 Bui Tuong Phong, Computer scientist, inventor of the Phong reflection model and the Phong shading interpolation method
Telle Whitney, CEO and President of the Anita Borg Institute for Women and Technology

Notable faculty

 Donald A. Dahlstrom - elected member of the National Academy of Engineering for his work on liquid-solids separation with the hydrocyclone
 David Evans - founder of the computer science department at the U, graphics pioneer and co-founder of Evans & Sutherland
 George R. Hill III - one time Dean of the College of Mines and Mineral Industries; held the Envirotech Professorship in Chemical Engineering in 1977
 Stephen Jacobsen - Distinguished professor and founder of Sarcos, a robotics company that is now part of Raytheon
 Willem Johan Kolff - the father of artificial organs, pioneer of hemodialysis as well as artificial organs
 Suhas Patil - Computer scientist, prolific entrepreneur and founder of Cirrus Logic, a fabless semiconductor company.
 Ivan Sutherland - Winner of the Turing Award in 1988 for Sketchpad, co-founder of Evans and Sutherland
 Thomas Stockham - founder of Soundstream Inc., one of the experts selected to investigate President Richard Nixon's White House tapes.
 Alexandra Illmer Forsythe - author of the first computer science textbook.

College Deans

References

External links
College of Engineering Homepage
Electrical and Computer Engineering Homepage
School of Computing Homepage
Mechanical Engineering Homepage
Chemical Engineering Homepage
Bioengineering Homepage
Materials Science and Engineering Homepage
Civil and Environmental Engineering

University of Utah
Educational institutions established in 1896
Education in Salt Lake City
Economy of Salt Lake City
Engineering schools and colleges in the United States
Engineering universities and colleges in Utah
1896 establishments in Utah
Mechanical engineering schools
University subdivisions in Utah